State Road 427 (NM 427) is a  state highway in the US state of New Mexico. NM 427's western terminus is at NM 418 in Deming, and the eastern terminus is at Interstate 10 Business (I-10 Bus.) in Deming.

Major intersections

See also

References

427
Transportation in Luna County, New Mexico